David W. Wiley (died October 24, 1885) was an American politician from Maryland. He served as a member of the Maryland House of Delegates, representing Harford County in 1882.

Career
David W. Wiley was a Democrat. He served as a member of the Maryland House of Delegates, representing Harford County in 1882. He ran for the Democratic nomination in the 1885 election for the Maryland House of Delegates.

Wiley was a farmer and cattle dealer.

Personal life
Wiley was married. He had four sons and one daughter, George, Nelson, William, Thomas and Mrs. John Free. He was a member of the Methodist Episcopal Church of Norrisville. He owned property in Norrisville, Maryland.

Wiley had a stroke in March 1885. Wiley died of typhoid fever on October 24, 1885, at the age of 69, at his home in Norrisville. He was buried in Norrisville.

References

Year of birth uncertain
1810s births
1885 births
People from Harford County, Maryland
Democratic Party members of the Maryland House of Delegates
Members of the Methodist Episcopal Church
Deaths from typhoid fever